William John Bulow (January 13, 1869February 26, 1960) was an American politician and a lawyer.  He was the first Democratic Governor of South Dakota, receiving the highest vote ever received by a Democratic candidate for governor up to that time, and then went on to serve as a member of the United States Senate.

Biography
Bulow was born of German ancestry to Joseph and Elizabeth (Ebendorf) Bulow near Moscow in Clermont County, Ohio, where he was raised and educated.  In 1893, he graduated with a law degree from the University of Michigan.   He was twice married - to Katherine J. Reedy and to Sarah (Johnson) Farrand.

Career
During 1893, Bulow moved to South Dakota.  He resided in Sioux Falls, where he worked for the Joe Kirby office.  Then, he came by horse and carriage to Beresford, where he set up his own law office and helped to develop the town. He was elected to the state senate of the South Dakota Legislature in 1898. While residing in Beresford, Bulow spent twenty-five years as city attorney from 1902 to 1927, except while serving as mayor from 1912 to 1913.  He also served as County Judge for Beresford in 1918.

In 1924, following the death of the Democratic Party's gubernatorial nominee, Bulow was selected as the Party's replacement nominee. Bulow lost the general election in a landslide to Republican Lieutenant Governor Carl Gunderson as a Farmer–Labor Party candidate siphoned off a significant share of the left-leaning vote. In 1926, Bulow defeated Gunderson for re-election, and he was re-elected in 1928. As governor, he pardoned the famous frontier gambler Poker Alice after her conviction of bootlegging and other charges related to running a house of prostitution.

In 1930, rather than seek re-election as Governor, Bulow ran for the U.S. Senate, and he narrowly defeated incumbent Senator William H. McMaster in the general election. He was narrowly re-elected in 1936. In 1942, however, Bulow faced strong opposition in the Democratic primary due to his opposition to the foreign policy of President Franklin D. Roosevelt. He lost renomination to former Governor Tom Berry in a landslide.

During his entire life, Bulow kept a legal residence in Beresford, South Dakota and voted by absentee ballot. After his loss in 1942, Bulow retired and spent the rest of his life residing in Washington, D.C. Bulow spent his last few years in failing health and was blind during his last four years. He was a member of the Alfalfa Club.

Beresford honored William J. Bulow in 1959 during the town's seventy-five year jubilee observance.  The city's park was dedicated as "Bulow Park" on June 3, 1959.

Death and legacy
Almost nine months later, Bulow died in Washington, D.C.; his body was returned to Beresford for burial at the St. John Catholic Cemetery, where he was interred  next to his first wife, Katherine (Reedy) Bulow (January 29, 1875September 17, 1918). Years later, Bulow's house in Beresford, South Dakota was declared a historic landmark (Governor William J. Bulow House).

References

External links

Listing for William J. Bulow's home on the National Register of Historic Places
National Governors Association

1869 births
1960 deaths
People from Clermont County, Ohio
American people of German descent
American Lutherans
Democratic Party United States senators from South Dakota
Democratic Party governors of South Dakota
Democratic Party South Dakota state senators
Mayors of places in South Dakota
South Dakota state court judges
Politicians from Sioux Falls, South Dakota
People from Beresford, South Dakota
South Dakota lawyers
University of Michigan Law School alumni